The  ("Community of Free Spirits") was a German homosexual advocacy group led by anarchist Adolf Brand. The group opposed the country's preeminent advocacy group, Magnus Hirschfeld's Scientific-Humanitarian Committee.

Founding members 
In 1903, founding members were German writer Benedict Friedlaender German nobleman Wilhelm Jansen (founder of organisation Jung-Wandervogel), the German painter Fidus, the German writer Peter Hille, the German composer Richard Meienreis, the German writer Paul Brandt, the German writer Walter Heinrich, the German writer Reiffegg, the Netherlandse painter and physician Lucien von Römer, the German writer Hanns Fuchs and Martha Marquardt.

References

Further reading 

 Manfred Herzer, 1997, „Adolf Brand und Der Eigene.“ Sternweiler, Andreas; Hannesen, Hans Gerhard, Hrsg. Auf Wiedersehen nach Berlin? 100 Jahre Schwulenbewegung (in deutscher Sprache). Berlin: Verlag Rosa Winkel. ISBN  3-86149-062-5
 Rainer Herrn, 1999, Anders bewegt. 100 Jahre Schwulenbewegung in Deutschland. MännerschwarmSkript Verlag, Hamburg 1999, ISBN 3-928983-78-4, S. 80.
 Hubert Kennedy, Adolf Brand
 Edgar J. Bauer, Drittes Geschlecht, „Der Eigene: sein Gründer“
 Niko Wahl, 2004, „Die Situation Homosexueller in Österreich vor 1938“, Verfolgung und Vermögensentzug Homosexueller Auf das Gebiet der Republik Österreich während der NS-Zeit: Bemühungen um Restitution, Entschädigung und Pensionen in der Zweiten Republik, Oldenbourg Wissenschaftsverlag, S. 94. ISBN 978-3-486-56798-4
 Marina Schuster: Die Gemeinschaft der Eigenen (Berlin), in: Wulf Wülfing, Karin Bruns und Rolf Parr (Hrsg.): Handbuch literarisch-kultureller Vereine, Gruppen und Bünde 1825–1933. Stuttgart : Metzler, 1998, S. 132–141

LGBT political advocacy groups in Germany
First homosexual movement
19th century in LGBT history
1903 establishments in Germany
1930s disestablishments in Germany
Organizations established in 1903